Amplectobeluidae is a clade of Cambrian radiodonts.

Definition

In 2014, Amplectobeluidae was defined as the most inclusive clade including Amplectobelua symbrachiata but not Anomalocaris canadensis, Tamisiocaris borealis, or Hurdia victoria.

Description 
Amplectobeluids could be recognized by frontal appendages with well-developed first distal endite, which forming a pincer-like structure that presumably better suited for a grasping function. Complete body fossils of amplectobeluids are only known by Amplectobelua and Lyrarapax, both showing combination of characters resembling Anomalocaris (i.e. streamlined body; small head with ovoid sclerites; well-developed swimming flaps; a pair of caudal furcae). Another distinctive features only known in amplectobeluid genera were pairs of gnathobase-like structures (known by Amplectobelua and Ramskoeldia), or an oral cone with combination of tetraradial arrangement and scale-like nodes (known by Lyrarapax and "Anomalocaris" kunmingensis).

Classification

Early in 2014, "Anomalocaris" kunmingensis was tentatively assigned to Amplectobelua by Vinther et al. Later that year, however, the discoverers of Lyrarapax unguispinus ignored that assessment and created a genus within Amplectobelua sensu Vinther et al. Indeterminate frontal appendages assignable to this group are known from the Parker Formation of Vermont.

Phylogeny

An a posteriori-weighted phylogenetic analysis in 2014 found the following relationships within the Amplectobeluidae:

References

Anomalocaridids
Prehistoric arthropod families